Thomas Baring may refer to:

Sir Thomas Baring, 2nd Baronet (1772–1848), British MP for High Wycombe and Hampshire
Thomas Baring (1799–1873), British banker and MP for Huntingdon, 1844–1873
Thomas Baring, 1st Earl of Northbrook (1826–1904), English statesman
Thomas Charles Baring (1831–1891), British banker and Conservative politician
Tom Baring (1839–1923), British banker